VA243 may refer to:
 Ariane flight VA243, an Ariane 5 launch that occurred on 25 September 2018
 Virgin Australia flight 243, with IATA flight number VA243
 Virginia State Route 243 (VA-243), a primary state highway in the United States